Anubhavangale Nanni is a 1979 Indian Malayalam film,  directed by I. V. Sasi. The film stars Madhu, Jayabharathi, Sankaradi and Balan K. Nair in the lead roles. The film has musical score by G. Devarajan.

Cast
Madhu
M. G. Soman
Jayabharathi
Seema
Sankaradi
Balan K. Nair
Cochin Haneefa
K. P. A. C. Lalitha
Kuthiravattam Pappu
Kottayam Santha
Meena (Malayalam actress)

Soundtrack
The music was composed by G. Devarajan and the lyrics were written by Yusufali Kechery and R. K. Damodaran.

References

External links
 

1979 films
1970s Malayalam-language films
Films directed by I. V. Sasi